Clover is a 1997 American made-for-television drama film that first aired on USA Network starring Elizabeth McGovern, Ernie Hudson, Zelda Harris and Beatrice Winde based on Dori Sanders' bestselling 1990 novel Clover.

Plot
White Sara Kate (McGovern) marries Gaten Hill (Hudson), a black widowed father. Shortly after their wedding, Gaten dies in an auto crash. So Sara has to take care of Gaten's daughter, Clover (Harris). Problem is, she and Clover have not exactly bonded and several of Gaten's friends and relatives object to her being Clover's guardian.

External links

1997 television films
1997 films
1997 drama films
Films based on American novels
USA Network original films
Films directed by Jud Taylor
American drama television films
1990s English-language films
1990s American films